A list of films produced by the Tollywood (Bengali language film industry) based in Kolkata in the year 1997.

Highest-grossing
Bakul Priya

A-Z of films

References

External links
 films of 1997 at the Internet Movie Database

1997
Bengali
 Bengali
1997 in Indian cinema